The 2019 MLS Expansion Draft was a special draft for the Major League Soccer expansion teams Inter Miami CF and Nashville SC that was held on November 19, 2019. On October 6, 2019, Inter Miami CF won the coin toss for the Expansion Priority Draft, and chose to select first in the 2019 MLS Expansion Draft. Lists of protected rosters and draft-eligible players were released by MLS on November 16, 2019.

Format
The rules for the 2019 MLS Expansion Draft as laid out by Major League Soccer.

 The five teams that had players selected by FC Cincinnati during the 2018 MLS Expansion Draft will be exempt from the 2019 Expansion Draft: D.C. United, Vancouver Whitecaps FC, FC Dallas, Houston Dynamo, and New York Red Bulls.
 Existing teams that are not exempt will be allowed to protect 12 players from their Roster. If a player is selected from a team, that team will no longer be available for selection.
 The expansion draft lasts five rounds, totaling ten players to be drafted. No trades are permitted during the draft.

Expansion Draft picks

Note: The order of selections was determined in the MLS Expansion Priority Draft on October 6, 2019.

Affected post-draft trades

Team-by-team-breakdown

Atlanta United FC

Chicago Fire

FC Cincinnati

Colorado Rapids

Columbus Crew SC

Los Angeles FC

LA Galaxy

Minnesota United FC

Montreal Impact

New England Revolution

New York City FC

Orlando City SC

Philadelphia Union

Portland Timbers

Real Salt Lake

San Jose Earthquakes

Seattle Sounders FC

Sporting Kansas City

Toronto FC

References

Major League Soccer Expansion Draft
Expansion
Nashville SC
Inter Miami CF
MLS Expansion Draft